Catherine I. Riley (born March 21, 1947) is a former lobbyist, civil servant and politician from Maryland. She represented Harford County in the Maryland House of Delegates from 1975 to 1982 and in the Maryland Senate from 1983 to 1990.

Early life
Catherine I. Riley was born in Harford County, Maryland on March 21, 1947. She attended parochial schools in Bel Air. She graduated in 1969 with a Bachelor of Science from Towson State College.

Career
Riley served in Maryland House of Delegates representing District 6 from 1975 to 1982. She also represented District 34 in the Maryland Senate from 1983 to 1990. She ran as a Democrat.

In 1995, Governor Parris Glendening hired Riley to his legislative lobbying team. She continued in that role and was appointed by Glendening to serve on the Maryland Public Service Commission on May 21, 1999. She was appointed as head of the Commission on October 18, 2000 by Glendening after Glenn Ivey announced he was stepping down. She served in that role until 2003.

Personal life
Riley was friends with fellow senator Thomas V. Miller Jr.

References

1947 births
Living people
People from Harford County, Maryland
Democratic Party Maryland state senators
Democratic Party members of the Maryland House of Delegates
Towson University alumni
20th-century American women politicians
21st-century American women politicians
Women state legislators in Maryland
21st-century American politicians
20th-century American politicians